Czech Republic competed at the 2014 Winter Olympics in Sochi, Russia, from 7 to 23 February 2014. A team of 83 athletes in 11 sports competed for the country.

Medalists

Alpine skiing 

Czech Republic qualified for the following events:

Men

Women

Biathlon 

Based on their performance at the 2012 and 2013 Biathlon World Championships, Czech Republic qualified 5 men and 5 women.

Men

Women

Mixed

Bobsleigh 

Czech Republic qualified a four-man sled in bobsleigh. The qualification was based on the world rankings as of 20 January 2014.

* – Denotes the driver of each sled

Cross-country skiing 

According to the quota allocation released on 20 January 2014, Czech Republic qualified a total quota of 10 athletes in the following events.

Distance
Men

Women

Sprint

Figure skating 

Czech Republic achieved the following quota places:

Freestyle skiing 

Czech Republic qualified five quota places in the following events:

Moguls

Ski cross

Qualification legend: FA – Qualify to medal round; FB – Qualify to consolation round

Slopestyle

Ice hockey 

Czech Republic qualified a men's team by being one of the 9 highest ranked teams in the IIHF World Ranking following the 2012 World Championships.

Men's tournament

Roster

Group stage

Qualification playoffs

Quarterfinals

Luge

Nordic combined 

Czech Republic qualified a total of four athletes and a spot in the team relay.

Short track speed skating 

Czech Republic qualified 1 man (1500 m) and 1 woman (1000 m, 1500 m) for the Olympics during World Cup 3 and 4 in November 2013.

Men

Women

Qualification legend: ADV – Advanced due to being impeded by another skater; FA – Qualify to medal round; FB – Qualify to consolation round

Ski jumping 

Czech Republic received the following start quotas:

Snowboarding 

Czech Republic qualified six quota places in the following events:

Alpine

Freestyle

Qualification Legend: QF – Qualify directly to final; QS – Qualify to semifinal

Snowboard cross

Qualification legend: FA – Qualify to medal round; FB – Qualify to consolation round

Speed skating 

Based on the results from the fall World Cups during the 2013–14 ISU Speed Skating World Cup season, Czech Republic earned the following start quotas:

Women

References

External links 

 
 

Nations at the 2014 Winter Olympics
2014
Winter Olympics